The Koolhoven F.K.51 was a 1930s Dutch two-seat basic training biplane built by the Koolhoven Company.

Design and development

The Koolhoven F.K.51 was the winning design in a 1935 Dutch government contest for a new trainer. Designed by Frederick Koolhoven the prototype biplane trainer first flew on 25 May 1935. It was a two-seater and had a fixed tailwheel undercarriage.
The Royal Netherlands Air Force (LVA) ordered 25 aircraft in 1936 and 1937, powered by a  Armstrong Siddeley Cheetah V radial engine. A further 29 aircraft were later ordered with  Armstrong Siddeley Cheetah IX engine.
The Dutch Naval Aviation Service ordered 29 aircraft each powered by a  Pratt & Whitney radials.
The Royal Dutch East Indies Army bought 38 aircraft between 1936 and 1938 each powered by a  Wright Whirlwind.
The Spanish Republican government ordered 28 F.K.51s, 11 with  Armstrong Siddeley Jaguar IVa radials and 17 aircraft (designated F.K.51bis) each powered by a  Wright R-975E Whirlwind radials.
Production totaled at least 142 aircraft. Twenty-four fuselages of the F.K.51 were assembled at Aviolanda.

Operational history

While the majority of F.K.51s were employed as elementary trainers within the Netherlands or in reconnaissance roles by the Royal Netherlands Air Force in the Dutch East Indies, twenty-eight were clandestinely sold to the Republican government during the Spanish Civil War, all despite a Dutch embargo on the sale of arms to either side of that conflict. Some of those arriving in Spain were used as light bombers by the Republicans in the Cantabrian region of Spain.

The F.K.51s were in active use in Royal Dutch Flight Schools during 1939–1940 in the training of young Dutch pilots.

Some LVA F.K.51s were briefly used for reconnaissance duties following the German invasion of the Netherlands in May 1940, with several F.K.51s being destroyed on the ground by attacking Luftwaffe aircraft. The Dutch Naval Aviation Service's F.K.51s were used to carry neutrality patrols from January 1940, with most being damaged or destroyed during an attack on De Kooy Airfield on 10 May.

In December 1941, the Royal Dutch East Indies Army had 27 F.K.51s available for service, and on 5 December 1941, its flying schools were shut down, allowing the F.K.51s to form two reconnaissance squadrons based on Java.

Operators

Dutch Naval Aviation Service
Royal Netherlands Air Force
Royal Dutch East Indies Army

Spanish Republican Air Force

Spanish Air Force

Specifications

See also

References

Bibliography

 

FK.51
Aircraft of the Royal Netherlands East Indies Army
1930s Dutch military trainer aircraft
Aircraft first flown in 1935
Single-engined tractor aircraft
Biplanes